Sagan may refer to:

Places 
 German name for
 Żagań, Poland
 Duchy of Żagań (1274–1549), one of the duchies of Silesia
 Sagan, Iran, a village in Hormozgan Province, Iran
 Sagan, West Azerbaijan, a village in West Azerbaijan Province, Iran
 Sagan, Ethiopia
 Sagan River, Ethiopia
 Şağan, Azerbaijan

 2709 Sagan, asteroid named after Carl Sagan
 Sagan (crater), impact crater on Mars named after Carl Sagan

People
 Segan, an Aramaic term for the deputy of a civil or religious leader, rendered as sagan in Hebrew

 Anna of Sagan (died 1541), duchess by marriage to Duke Charles I of Münsterberg-Oels
 Alexandra "Sasha" Sagan (born 1982), American author, television producer, and filmmaker
 Carl Sagan (1934–1996), American astronomer, science writer, and advocate for rationalism and skepticism
 Dorion Sagan (born 1959), American writer, one of Carl Sagan's sons
 Françoise Sagan (1935–2004), French writer
 Ginetta Sagan (1925–2000), American human-rights activist
 Hedwig of Sagan (died 1390), Queen of Poland as wife of Casimir III
 Jacob Dungau Sagan (born 1946), Malaysian politician and Deputy Minister of International Trade and Industry, Malaysia
 Jeanne Sagan (born 1979), American musician, bassist for All That Remains
 Juraj Sagan (born 1988), Slovak cyclist, Peter Sagan's brother
 Leontine Sagan (1889–1974), Austrian film director and actress
 Nick Sagan (born 1970), American writer, one of Carl Sagan's sons
 Peter Sagan (born 1990), Slovak cyclist, Juraj Sagan's brother
 Scott Sagan (born 1955), professor of political science at Stanford University

Engineering, science and technology
 Sagan (number), the number of stars in the observable universe
 Sagan (unit of measurement), humorous unit of measurement named after Carl Sagan
 S.A.G.A.N., social and collaborative web-platform
 Sagan (software), a high performance, multi-threaded log analysis engine

Other 
 Sagan (ceremony), a Nepalese sacred ritual
 Sagan (film), 2008 French film about the French writer Françoise Sagan
 Sagan Tosu, Japanese professional football club based in Tosu, Saga Prefecture

See also

 
 
 Sagen (disambiguation)